Plockton railway station is a railway station on the Kyle of Lochalsh Line, serving the village of Plockton in the Highlands, north-west Scotland. ScotRail, who manage the station, operate all services here.

History
The station was built by the Kyle of Lochalsh Extension (Highland Railway) between Stromeferry and Kyle of Lochalsh, opening on 2 November 1897.

The station building was built by the Highland Railway, and designed by engineer Murdoch Paterson. It was B-listed by Historic Scotland in 1986. A camping coach was positioned here by the Scottish Region from 1956 to 1964, for the last two years a Pullman camping coach was used.

The building was completely renovated during 2009/2010 and is now a privately owned self-catering holiday cottage.

Facilities 
The only facilities at the station are a car park, a help point, a bench and bike racks. The station has step-free access. As there are no facilities to purchase tickets, passengers must buy one in advance, or from the guard on the train.

Passenger volume 

The statistics cover twelve month periods that start in April.

Services 
Four trains each way call on weekdays and Saturdays. On Sundays, there is only one train each way, plus a second from May to late September only.

References

Bibliography

External links 

 Video footage of the station on YouTube

Plockton
Category B listed buildings in Highland (council area)
Railway stations in Highland (council area)
Railway stations served by ScotRail
Listed railway stations in Scotland
Railway stations in Great Britain opened in 1897
Former Highland Railway stations